Comostola subtiliaria is a moth of the family Geometridae first described by Otto Vasilievich Bremer in 1864. It is a widespread species which is found in Korea and adjacent parts of Siberia, Japan, Borneo, Sumatra, India (north-east Himalaya), South China, Taiwan, Borneo, Sumatra, and Sri Lanka.

The moth is generally green with a discal spot in its hindwing which is more regular and square than other species. The caterpillar is known to feed on Malus, Eurya and Viburnum species.

Subspecies
Four subspecies are recognized.
Comostola subtiliaria demeritaria Prout, 1917 - Taiwan
Comostola subtiliaria insulata Inoue, 1963 - Japan
Comostola subtiliaria kawazoei Inoue, 1963
Comostola subtiliaria nympha Butler, 1881

Gallery

References

Moths of Asia
Moths described in 1864